General elections were held in the Netherlands on 26 May 1981. The Christian Democratic Appeal (CDA) emerged as the largest party, winning 48 of the 150 seats in the House of Representatives.

The incumbent Christian Democratic Appeal-People's Party for Freedom and Democracy coalition lost its overall majority leading to a new coalition being formed between the CDA, the Labour Party (PvdA) and Democrats 66, with the CDA's Dries van Agt continuing as Prime Minister. However due to disagreements between the CDA and PvdA on government spending the coalition collapsed after just a year, leading to fresh elections.

Results

By province

References

1981
1981 elections in the Netherlands
May 1981 events in Europe